Konstantinos Garefis (Greek: Κωνσταντίνος Γαρέφης) was a Greek chieftain of the Macedonian Struggle.

Biography 
Garefis was born in 1874 in Milies of Magnesia. His grandfather, who was from Souli, was prosecuted by Ali Pasha, settled in Milies in order to get away. Garefis was of half Epirot and half Sarakatsani origin.

Armed actions 
In 1905 Garefis joined the Macedonian Struggle and became the co-leader of Konstantinos Mazarakis-Ainian's armed group, acting mainly in Vermio. When the action of Konstantinos Mazarakis became known and his group had to be dissolved, Garefis replaced him by organizing his own armed group in the late 1905, expanding the range of action and restoring security to the area.

Final moments 
On August 6, 1906, he discovered the hut in the village of Chernesovo Aridea (now Garefio), in which his enemies were hiding, the komitadjis Lucas and Karatasos. Captain Garefis, with no fear, entered the hut and killed Karatasos and heavily injured Lucas. However, during the clash, he was injured by the men of Luca. Garefis, despite his serious injury, insisted, before he left the field of battle, to see the result of it which was successful.

Few days later he died because of the wounds on August 24, 1906.

In 1922, Chernesovo got renamed to Garefio to honour him.

References

Sources 
 Βασίλης Κ. Γούναρης, "Η ιστοριογραφία και η χαρτογραφία του Μακεδονικού Ζητήματος", στην ιστοσελίδα /www.imma.edu.gr του Ιδρύματος Μουσείου Μακεδονικού Αγώνα.
 Κώστας Λιάπης, "Κώστας Γαρέφης (1874-1906)" 
 Κωνσταντίνος Γαρέφης, 1874 - 1906, "Μακεδόνες Μακεδονομάχοι", p. 58-60
 Μακεδονομάχοι - Κωνσταντίνος Γαρέφης

1874 births
1906 deaths
Greek people of the Macedonian Struggle
Sarakatsani
People killed in action
People from Milies
Greek people from the Ottoman Empire